HD 110432 is a Be star in the south-east of Crux, behind the center of the southern hemisphere's dark
Coalsack Nebula. It has a stellar classification of B1IVe, which means it is a subgiant star of class B that displays emission lines in its spectrum. This is a variable star of the Gamma Cassiopeiae type, indicating it is a shell star with a circumstellar disk of gas about the equator, and has the variable star designation BZ Crucis. It is not known to be a member of a binary system, although it is probably a member of the open cluster NGC 4609. The X-ray emission may be caused by magnetic activity, or possibly by accretion onto a white dwarf companion.

Distance
The distance of  published in the 2007 new Hipparcos reduction is over twice the distance of the Coalsack Nebula.

References

Crux (constellation)
Be stars
B-type subgiants
Cruciis, BZ
4830
110432
062027
Durchmusterung objects